The pla taphian is a traditional central Thai handicraft. It is a woven hanging mobile, usually made from palm leaves, in the form of a fish (specifically the barb, which gives it its name). The barb is traditionally regarded as a symbol of prosperity and abundance, and pla taphian mobiles were usually hung over babies' cradles. Their production has largely declined over the centuries, but there are still centres of production where the craft is preserved. Today, pla taphian are mostly used as a decorative object.

References 

Fish in art
Palm trees in culture
Thai handicrafts